Tomáš is a Czech and Slovak given name, equivalent to the name Thomas.

It may refer to:
 Tomáš Garrigue Masaryk (1850–1937), first President of Czechoslovakia
 Tomáš Baťa (1876–1932), Czech footwear entrepreneur
 Tomáš Berdych (born 1985), Czech tennis player
 Tomáš Cibulec (born 1978), Czech tennis player
 Tomáš Dvořák (born 1972), Czech athlete
 Tomáš Enge (born 1976), Czech motor racing driver
 Tomáš Fleischmann (born 1984), Czech ice hockey player
 Tomáš Kaberle (born 1978), Czech ice hockey player
 Tomáš Kramný, (born 1973), Czech ice hockey player
 Tomas Kalnoky (born 1980), Czech/American singer/guitarist
 Tomáš Kratochvíl (born 1971), Czech race walker
 Tomas Mezera (born 1958), Czech/Australian racing driver
 Tomáš Rosický (born 1980), Czech football player
 Tomáš Šmíd (born 1956), Czech tennis player
 Tomáš Verner (born 1986), Czech figure skater
 Tomáš Vokoun (born 1976), Czech ice hockey player
 Tomáš Zíb (born 1976), Czech tennis player
 Tomáš Kopecký (born 1982), Slovak ice hockey player
 Tomáš Oravec (born 1980), Slovak football player
 Tomáš Surový (born 1981), Slovak ice hockey player
 Tomáš Tatar (born 1990), Slovak ice hockey player
 Tomáš Klíma (born 1990), Slovak ice hockey player

Czech masculine given names
Slovak masculine given names